Neurotoxicology and Teratology is a bimonthly peer-reviewed scientific journal covering research on the toxicological effects of chemical and physical agents on the nervous system. It was established in 1979 as Neurobehavioral Toxicology, was renamed to Neurobehavioral Toxicology and Teratology in 1981, and obtained its current title in 1987. It is published by Elsevier and the editor-in-chief is P.J. Bushnell (United States Environmental Protection Agency).

Abstracting and indexing 
The journal is abstracted and indexed in:

According to the Journal Citation Reports, the journal has a 2019 impact factor of 3.274.

References

External links 
 

Elsevier academic journals
Bimonthly journals
Publications established in 1979
English-language journals
Toxicology journals
Neuroscience journals